Hip-Hopera is the debut studio album by Volume 10. It was released on Immortal Records and RCA Records in 1994. It peaked at number 66 on Billboards Top R&B/Hip-Hop Albums chart.

Track listing

Charts

References

External links
 

1994 debut albums
Hip hop albums by American artists
Immortal Records albums
RCA Records albums
Rap operas